Hernando High School is a public high school located in Brooksville, Florida. It is part of the Hernando County School District. It has been in operation since 1889, which makes it one of the oldest, continuously operating public high schools in the United States.

Community
Hernando High School is one of five high schools in Hernando County. Brooksville is a rural community of about 9,000 residents located 40 miles north of Tampa and 60 miles west of Orlando on Florida's Nature Coast.

Curriculum
The school day is composed of seven 50 minute class periods with two lunch periods (A & B) on Monday, Wednesday, and Friday; and 8 43 minute class periods with two lunch periods (A & B) on Tuesday and Thursday. A broad range of course offerings include student education, career and technical courses and grade-level academics.  The curriculum also includes dual enrollment programs through Pasco–Hernando State College as well as Advanced Placement courses on campus and through Florida Virtual School.

History
In 1849, the Florida Legislature passed and enacted its first Educational Legislation. This new law authorized construction of schools. At this time Hernando County included what is now known as Citrus and Pasco Counties. In the 1850s a handful of privately constructed schools existed in Hernando County in the Bayport and Spring Hill communities as well as a school in the Union Baptist Church in Brooksville.

In October 1887, the State Legislature enacted legislation that split Hernando County into 3 smaller counties; Citrus County - to the north, Pasco County, to the south, and Hernando County, in the center of the two. When the county was split into three, Brooksville, FL (in Hernando County) was the only community large enough to support a high school. So a committee was formed to establish such a school. This committee consisted of 3 locally prominent businessmen, William S. Hope, S.W. Davis and Warren W. Springstead. In October 1888 the committee proposed building a school designed to house grades 1 through 10. At the time, 10th would be the highest level of education offered in Hernando County

The proposal passed and the committee purchased land for the new school from Martha and Thomas Cook in the Saxon Heights area near the old Scarborough House. The land was purchased for a total of $499.00. A frame structure was completed and on February 4, 1889, Hernando High School opened. At its inception the Hernando High School staff consisted of Principal E. R. Warrener and 3 teachers. Hardy Croom and Alda Burns Wright were notable members of the inaugural class of 1889.

Facilities
 Michael Joseph Bristol Instructional Buildings -  Three 2-story buildings that house the bulk of HHS' classrooms.
 Michael Imhoff Gymnasium - basketball and volleyball venue.
 Jerome Brown Weight Training Facility - Home to the Leopard wrestling team.
 Hernando High Performing Arts Center - A facility to accommodate traveling shows.
 Tom Fisher Stadium - Home to Leopard Football, Soccer, and Track since the 1960s.
 Baseball Field - Home to a storied baseball tradition
 Agriculture Science Building - Home to HHS' Agriculture program.
 Band, Drama, and Chorus Building - Home to Hernando High's marching band, The Royale Regiment, and Drama Department.
 Culinary Building - Home to Hernandough Catering, Hernando's dining and catering establishment.
 Leopard Lunch Room - Opening at the beginning of the 2007 School year. A dining Facility.
 Hernando High Cafe - coffee shop.  Also serves breakfast and lunch.

Administration
 Leechele Booker- Principal 
 Lorenzo Fields- Asst. Principal
 Brad Merschbach Asst. Principal
 Daniel O'Rourke- Asst. Principal

Notable alumni
 Tammy Alexander (class of 1981), murder victim known as the "Caledonia Jane Doe", killed before graduating
 Bronson Arroyo (class of 1995): Major League Baseball pitcher
 Christian Arroyo (infielder born 1995),(class of 2013) Major League Baseball San Francisco Giants
 Jerome Brown (class of 1983): American football defensive tackle who played for the University of Miami (1983-1986) and NFL (1987-1991)
 John Capel (class of 1996): track and field sprinter
 Mitch English: television meteorologist
 Paul Farmer (class of 1978): physician and humanitarian
 George Floyd: American football defensive back who played for the New York Jets in 1982 and 1984
George Lowe (class of 1975): Voice actor who starred in Space Ghost Coast to Coast and did voiceovers for various media companies and commercials
 Bill McCollum (class of 1962): Republican member of the United States House of Representatives (1981-2001); Attorney General of Florida (2007-2011)
 Taylor Rotunda (class of 2008): Pro wrestler for WWE, who wrestles as Bo Dallas.
 Windham Rotunda (class of 2005): Pro wrestler for WWE, who wrestles as Bray Wyatt
 Mike Walker (class of 1984): Major League Baseball pitcher (1988-1996)
 Tyrone Woods (class of 1987): Nippon Professional Baseball first baseman (2003-2008)

References

External links
 

High schools in Hernando County, Florida
Public high schools in Florida
1889 establishments in Florida
Educational institutions established in 1889